is a 2000 Japanese television series. Starring Hideaki Takizawa, Yasuko Matsuyuki and Yūka, it aired from 13 April to 22 June 2000 on Fuji TV.

Plot
Nao Masaki (Hideaki Takizawa) is a 17-year-old high school student whose family runs an Okonomiyaki shop. Suspecting medical malpractice, he decides to find out the truth of her death. With the help of a neighbourhood lawyer Setsu Kirino (Yasuko Matsuyuki), will he succeed in finding the truth of her death when the hospital is determined to hide it until the end?

Cast
 Hideaki Takizawa as Nao Masaki
 Yasuko Matsuyuki as Setsu Kirino
 Yūka as Ami Isetani
 Keiko Takeshita as Teruko Masaki
 Ran Ito as Akiko Isetani
 Isao Bito as Shiro Masaki
 Ren Osugi as Keizo Isetani
 Hitomi Satō as Yuko Masaki
 Masaki Kyomoto as Etsushi Minami

References

External links
Official web site in Japanese
Japanese Drama Database: Taiyou wa shizumanai

Japanese drama television series
Fuji TV dramas
2000 in Japanese television
2000 Japanese television series debuts
2000 Japanese television series endings
2000 films